Boston University Metropolitan College (MET) is one of the 17 degree-granting schools and colleges of Boston University. 

Founded in 1965, Metropolitan College offers 78 undergraduate and graduate degree and certificate programs, available part time and full-time, along with individual courses that are open to the general public. Classes are offered evenings on the Boston University Charles River Campus and at military base locations (Hanscom AFB, Mass., and MCAS Cherry Point and MCB Camp Lejeune in N.C.). The College's offerings also include 32 online programs and 18 blended programs.

Faculty 
Metropolitan College has its own full-time, adjunct, and part-time faculty, while also sharing faculty members with other Boston University schools and colleges. Of the full-time faculty, 94% hold doctoral degrees.

Academic Degree and Certificate Programs

Master of Liberal Arts Degrees 
 Gastronomy

Master of Science Degrees 
 Actuarial Science
 Administrative Studies
 Advertising
 Applied Business Analytics
 Applied Data Analytics
 Arts Administration
 City Planning
 Computer Information Systems
 Computer Science
 Criminal Justice
 Enterprise Risk Management 
 Financial Management 
 Global Marketing Management 
 Health Communication 
 Insurance Management 
 Leadership
 Project Management 
 Software Development
 Supply Chain Management 
 Telecommunication
 Urban Affairs

Graduate Certificates 
 Advanced Information Technology
 Applied Business Analytics 
 Applied Sustainability
 Arts Management
 Corporate Finance
 Computer Networks
 Cybercrime Investigation & Cybersecurity 
 Data Analytics
 Database Management & Business Intelligence 
 Digital Forensics 
 Electronic Commerce, Systems & Technology
 Enterprise Risk Management
 Financial Management 
 Fundraising Management
 Global Marketing Management
 Health Informatics
 Information Security 
 Information Technology 
 Innovation & Entrepreneurship
 International Business Management
 International Finance
 Investment Analysis
 IT Project Management 
 Medical Information Security & Privacy
 Paralegal Studies
 Project Management 
 Software Engineering
 Software Engineering in Health Care Systems
 Strategic Management in Criminal Justice 
 Supply Chain Management
 Sustainable Economic Development via Tourism
 Urban Policy & Planning
 Visual & Digital Health Communication
 Web Application Development

Bachelor of Liberal Studies Degrees 
 Art History
 English & American Literature
 History
 Interdisciplinary Studies 
 Philosophy
 Undergraduate Degree Completion Program (online)

Bachelor of Science Degrees 
 Accelerated Degree Completion Program
 Biology
 Biomedical Laboratory & Clinical Sciences
 Computer Science
 Criminal Justice
 Economics
 Management Studies
 Mathematics
 Psychology
 Sociology
 Urban Affairs

Undergraduate Certificates 
 Biotechnology
 Business Management
 Clinical Research
 Computer Science
 Criminal Justice
 International Business Management
 Pre-Medical Studies (Post-Baccalaureate)

Non-Credit and Lifelong Learning Programs 
 Center for Professional Education
 Evergreen
 Programs in Food & Wine

U.S. News Rankings 
U.S. News & World Report Rankings 2018:
 #2, Best Online Graduate Criminal Justice Programs
 #6, Best Online Graduate Information Technology Programs
 #9, Best Online Graduate Business Programs (excluding MBAs)

Professional Accreditation 
Metropolitan College programs are accredited by the following organizations: 
 European Foundation for Management Development (EFMD) Program Accreditation System (EPAS) (Master of Science programs in Administrative Studies and management)
 Project Management Institute Global Accreditation Center for Project Management Education Programs (GAC) (Master of Science programs in Computer Information Systems (IT Project Management concentration) and Project Management) 
 Commission on Accreditation for Health Informatics and Information Management Education (CAHIIM) (Master of Science in Computer Information Systems, Health Informatics concentration)
 New England Association of Schools and Colleges (NEASC), as part of Boston University
 AACSB International―The Association to Advance Collegiate Schools of Business, as part of Boston University

Awards

United States Distance Learning Association (USDLA)
 21st Century Award for Best Practices in Distance Learning (2016)
Blackboard
 Blackboard Catalyst Exemplary Course Award—Directors Choice for Courses with Distinction (2014)
 Blackboard Catalyst Exemplary Course Award (2012)
Telly
 Video Bronze Award (2012)

External links
 www.bu.edu/met
 www.bu.edu/online
 www.bu.edu/professional
 www.bu.edu/evergreen
 www.bu.edu/foodandwine

References

Metropolitan College